Potash may refer to:

 Potash, salt that contains potassium in water-soluble form (such as potassium carbonate)
 Potash, Suffolk, United Kingdom
 Potash City, Jordan
 Potash Corporation of Saskatchewan
 Potashes (gang), a 19th-century New York City street gang

People
 Dan Potash, a television reporter for FSN Pittsburgh
 Richard Jay Potash